Uvais Ahmad (born 28 December 1999) is an Indian cricketer. He made his List A debut on 24 September 2019, for Arunachal Pradesh in the 2019–20 Vijay Hazare Trophy.

References

External links
 

1999 births
Living people
Indian cricketers
Arunachal Pradesh cricketers